Ectoedemia similigena is a moth of the family Nepticulidae. It is only known from its type locality, Jalta botanical garden, on the Crimea (Ukraine). The species has not been found again, and it is possible that it is actually a species from somewhere in Central or Eastern Asia, introduced with plants.

Adults are on in May.

The hostplant is unknown, but it is probably a Populus species.

External links
Fauna Europaea
Western Palaearctic Ectoedemia (Zimmermannia) Hering and Ectoedemia Busck s. str. (Lepidoptera, Nepticulidae): five new species and new data on distribution, hostplants and recognition

Nepticulidae
Moths of Europe
Moths described in 1994